Türkəncil (also, Turkyandzhil and Turkyandzhil’) is a village and municipality in the Lankaran Rayon of Azerbaijan. It has a population of 551. The municipality consists of the villages of Türkəncil and Qodəsə.

References 

Populated places in Lankaran District